Alston's mouse opossum (Marmosa alstoni), also known as Alston's opossum, is a medium-sized pouchless marsupial of the family Didelphidae. It is arboreal and nocturnal, inhabiting forests from Belize to northern Colombia. The main components of its diet are insects and fruits, but it may also eat small rodents, lizards, and bird eggs. It was formerly assigned to the genus Micoureus, which was made a subgenus of Marmosa in 2009.

References

External links
Image at ADW 

Opossums
Marsupials of Central America
Mammals of Colombia
Mammals described in 1900